The Ladies' Challenge Plate is one of the events at Henley Royal Regatta on the River Thames at Henley-on-Thames in England. Crews of men's eight-oared boats below the standard of the Grand Challenge Cup can enter, although international standard heavyweight crews are not permitted to row in the Ladies' Plate.

The Ladies' Plate was first competed for in 1845, initially as the New Challenge Cup. The following year, it became the Ladies' Challenge Plate, and it has been competed for every year since, except for years which were affected by the two World Wars and the COVID-19 pandemic. Until 1966, the Ladies' Plate was originally for academic institutions in the United Kingdom, and Trinity College Dublin, but in 1967, the entry requirements were relaxed to allow entries from academic institutions throughout the world. Further changes in 1985 allowed entries from any club, and certain restrictions were placed on entries of the Thames Challenge Cup to ensure that crews of the required standard entered the more senior Ladies' Plate.

Winners

References

Henley Royal Regatta trophies
Henley Royal Regatta winners 1839-1939
Henley Royal Regatta winners 1946-present

1845 establishments in England
Events at Henley Royal Regatta
Rowing trophies and awards